Rudolf Klupsch (26 June 1905 – 18 May 1992) was a German sprinter. He competed in the men's 400 metres at the 1936 Summer Olympics.

References

1905 births
1992 deaths
Athletes (track and field) at the 1936 Summer Olympics
German male sprinters
Olympic athletes of Germany
Place of birth missing